The Cook County, Illinois, general election was held on November 8, 2016.

Primaries were held March 15, 2016.

Elections were held for Clerk of the Circuit Court, Recorder of Deeds, State's Attorney, Cook County Board of Review districts 1 and 2, four seats on the Water Reclamation District Board, and judgeships on the Circuit Court of Cook County.

Election information
2016 was a presidential election year in the United States. The primaries and general elections for Cook County races coincided with those for federal races (President, House, and Senate) and those for state elections.

Voter turnout
Voter turnout in Cook County during the primaries was 51.12%, with 1,512,348 ballots cast. Among these, 1,197,073 Democratic, 314,517 Republican, 404 Green, and 354 nonpartisan primary ballots were cast. The city of Chicago saw 53.52% turnout. Suburban Cook County saw 48.61% turnout, its highest turnout for presidential primaries since at least 1992. In Chicago, more than 118,000 votes cast were early votes, setting a record for the time for Chicago primaries (since surpassed by the 2020 elections). In suburban Cook County, 31,409 mail-in ballots were returned by voters, setting a record (also surpassed in 2020).

The general election saw 71.54% turnout, with 2,205,504 ballots cast. Chicago saw 71.04% turnout and suburban Cook County saw 72.07% turnout.

Clerk of the Circuit Court 

In the 2016 Clerk of the Circuit Court of Cook County election,  incumbent fourth-term Clerk Dorothy A. Brown, a Democrat, was reelected.

Primaries

Democratic

Republican

General election

Recorder of Deeds 

In the 2016 Cook County Recorder of Deeds election,  incumbent first-term Recorder of Deeds Karen Yarbrough, a Democrat, was reelected, running unopposed in both the Democratic primary and general election.

This was ultimately the last election held for this office, as, on the same day as the general election, Cook County voters approved a ballot measure to merge the office with that of Cook County Clerk by December 7, 2020.

Primaries

Democratic

Republican
No candidates, ballot-certified or formal write-in, ran in the Republican primary.

General election

State's Attorney 

In the 2016 Cook County State's Attorney election,  incumbent second-term State's Attorney Anita Alvarez, a Democrat, lost her bid for reelection, being unseated in the Democratic primary by Kim Foxx, who went on to win the general election.

Only Democrats had this office ever since Richard A. Devine unseated Republican Jack O'Malley in 1996.

Primaries

Democratic

Republican

General election

Cook County Board of Review

In the 2016 Cook County Board of Review election, two seats, one Democratic-held and one Republican-held, out of its three seats were up for election. Both incumbents won reelection.

The Cook County Board of Review has its three seats rotate the length of terms. In a staggered fashion (in which no two seats have coinciding two-year terms), the seats rotate between two consecutive four-year terms and a two-year term.

1st district

Incumbent second-term member Dan Patlak, a Republican, was reelected. Patlak was last reelected in 2012. This election was to a four-year term.

Primaries

Democratic
No candidates, ballot-certified or formal write-in, ran in the Democratic primary. The Democrats ultimately nominated Marty Stack.

Republican

General election

2nd district

Incumbent member Michael Cabonargi, a Democrat first appointed in 2011 and elected to a full term in 2012, was reelected, running unopposed in both the Democratic primary and general election. This election was to a two-year term.

Primaries

Democratic

Republican
No candidates, ballot-certified or formal write-in, ran in the Republican primary.

General election

Water Reclamation District Board 

In the 2016 Metropolitan Water Reclamation District of Greater Chicago  election, four of the nine seats on the Metropolitan Water Reclamation District of Greater Chicago board were up for election. Three were regularly scheduled elections, and one was a special election due to a vacancy.

Democrats won all four seats up for reelection. The two incumbents seeking reelection won, and two new members were also elected.

Regularly-scheduled election
Three six-year term seats were up for the regularly-scheduled election. Since three six-year seats were up for election, voters could vote for up to three candidates, and the top-three finishers would win.

Two of the incumbents for the three seats were seeking reelection, Barbara McGowan and Mariyana Spyropoulos, both Democrats. Each won reelection. The third, newly elected, winner of the general election was fellow Democrat Josina Morita.

Primaries

Democratic

Republican
No candidates, ballot-certified or formal write-in, ran in the Republican primary.

General election

Unexpired term (2 years)
A special election was held to fill the seat vacated when Patrick Daley Thompson resigned to assume office as a Chicago alderman. This seat had been filled with an interim appointment by Governor Bruce Rauner of David J. Walsh. Walsh was a Republican.

Primaries

Democratic

Republican

General election

Judicial elections

13 judgeships on the Circuit Court of Cook County were up for partisan elections due to vacancies. 57 judgeships on the Circuit Court of Cook County were up for retention elections.

22 subcircuit courts judgeships were up for partisan elections due to vacancies. Other judgeships had retention elections.

Ballot questions 
Two ballot questions were included on ballots county-wide during the November general election.

Clerk-Recorder Office
A ballot question was referred by the Cook County Board of Commissioners to the voters of Cook County as to whether the position of Cook County Recorder of Deeds should be eliminated, and its duties merged into the position Cook County Clerk. Voters ultimately approved the ballot question.

The sponsor of the legislation passed by the Cook County Board of Commissioners which created the ballot question was John Fritchey. The legislation to create this ballot question passed unanimously in a vote of all seventeen members of the Board of Commissioners.

The last time the county had voted by referendum on whether to eliminate an elected office was in 1972, when voters strongly voted in favor of eliminating the elected position of Cook County Coroner, replacing it with an appointed medical examiner.

The ballot measure asked the question,

Earned Sick Time
A ballot question was created by a successful citizen initiative petition which asked Cook County voters whether they believed that Illinois should enact the Earned Sick Time for Employees Act, thus allowing Illinois workers to earn up to 40 hours of paid sick leave.

The ballot measure asked the question,

Other elections 
Coinciding with the primaries, elections were held to elect both the Democratic and Republican committeepeople for the wards of Chicago.

See also 
 2016 Illinois elections

References 

Cook County
Cook County, Illinois elections
Cook County 2016
Cook County